Grønlundfjellet is a village in the municipality of Gjerdrum, Norway. Its population (2005) was 2,174.

References

Villages in Akershus
Gjerdrum